The NDR Radiophilharmonie is a German radio orchestra, affiliated with the Norddeutscher Rundfunk (NDR) in Hanover, the capital of Lower Saxony. The orchestra principally gives concerts in the Großer Sendesaal of the Landesfunkhaus Niedersachsen.

A historical precursor orchestra was the Niedersächsisches Sinfonie-Orchester, a radio orchestra that was affiliated with the Nordische Rundfunk Aktiengesellschaft since the late 1920s.  Following World War II, with the founding of the Nordwestdeutscher Rundfunk (NWDR), the current orchestra was founded in 1950 originally as the Rundfunkorchester Hannover.<ref>Klaus Mlynek, Waldemar R. Röhrbein, Dieter Brosius, Geschichte der Stadt Hannover, page 760, 1994 "Erfolgreicher war die Entwicklung des Rundfunkorchesters Hannover (ROH).8" Gegründet 1950, als das N WDR-Studio Hannover aus der Pädagogischen Hochschule in das neue Funkhaus am Maschsee übersiedelte, erwarb sich der zunächst aus nur 45 ..."</ref> Willy Steiner was the first chief conductor, beginning in 1950, and held the post until 1975. During his tenure, the orchestra later changed its name to the Radiophilharmonie Hannover. In 2003, the orchestra took its current name of the NDR Radiophilharmonie.

After Steiner, chief conductors have been Bernhard Klee, Eiji Ōue and Eivind Gullberg Jensen.  Since 2009, Ōue has held the title of conductor laureate (Ehrendirigent'') with the orchestra.  Since 2014, the orchestra's current chief conductor has been Andrew Manze.  In March 2017, the orchestra announced the extension of Manze's contract through to 2021.  In February 2019, the orchestra announced a further extension of Manze's contract to 2023.

The orchestra has recorded commercially for such labels as CPO and Pentatone.

Chief conductors
 Willy Steiner (1950–1975)
 Bernhard Klee (1976–1979)
 Zdenĕk Mácal (1980–1983)
 Aldo Ceccato (1985–1989)
 Bernhard Klee (1991–1995)
 Eiji Ōue (1998–2009)
 Eivind Gullberg Jensen (2009–2014)
 Andrew Manze (2014–present)

References

External links 
 Official German-language webpage of the NDR Radiophilharmonie
 

Norddeutscher Rundfunk
German symphony orchestras
Musical groups established in 1950